The 2020 North Dakota State Bison football team represented North Dakota State University in the 2020–21 NCAA Division I FCS football season. They were led by second-year head coach Matt Entz. The team played in the Fargodome in Fargo, North Dakota, for the 28th season as members of the Missouri Valley Football Conference (MVFC). They entered the season as defending national champions, having won eight of the prior nine FCS titles.

Previous season

In 2019, the Bison finished the regular season 12–0, the second consecutive undefeated Bison season, and won their ninth consecutive MVFC title. They received an automatic qualifying bid to the FCS Playoff Tournament and were seeded as the No. 1 team.  The Bison then went 4–0 in the FCS playoffs to finish 16–0 as FCS champions, becoming the first team at any level of college football to finish a season 16–0 since Yale in 1894. They also extended their FCS-record winning streak to 37 games.

Schedule
NDSU had games scheduled against Oregon (September 5, rescheduled to 2028), Drake (September 12, rescheduled to 2022), and North Carolina A&T (September 19, rescheduled to 2022) that were postponed before the season due to the COVID-19 pandemic.

Personnel

Roster

Game summaries

Regular Season

Central Arkansas

Youngstown State

Southern Illinois

Missouri State

Illinois State

North Dakota

Ranking movements

Players drafted into the NFL

References

North Dakota State
North Dakota State Bison football seasons
North Dakota State
North Dakota State Bison football
North Dakota State Bison football